Age fabrication occurs when people deliberately misrepresent their true age. This is usually done with the intention to garner privileges or status that would not otherwise be available to that person (i.e., a minor misrepresenting their age in order to garner the privileges given to adults). It may be done through the use of oral or written statements or through the altering, doctoring or forging of vital records.

On some occasions, age is increased so as to make cut-offs for minimum legal or employable age in showbusiness or professional sports. Sometimes it is not the people themselves who lower their public age, but others around them such as publicists, parents, and other handlers.  Most cases involve taking or adding one or two years to their age. However, in more extreme cases such as with Al Lewis and Charo, over a decade has been added or subtracted. Official state documents (such as birth, marriage and death certificates, the census, and other identity documents) typically provide the correct date.

Although uncommon in modern Western society, it is still possible for a person not to know their exact date of birth. Such a person may arbitrarily choose a date of birth which after later research is found to be false. This situation should not be considered age fabrication as there is no obvious intent to deceive on the part of the individual.

Subtracting time from one's age is often known in English as "shaving", while adding time to one's age may be referred to as "napping".

Sports

In sports, people may falsify their age to make themselves appear younger thus enabling them to compete in world-level junior events (with prominent examples appearing in football (soccer) and athletics). In gymnastics, diving, and figure skating, competitors may claim to be older in order to bring themselves over the age minimums for senior competition or below an age limit for junior competition. A female pair skater may be aged up while her male partner may be aged down to allow them to compete together. In some cases, they may feel pressure to change their ages. As these fabrications have an effect upon a person's performance (through the greater athleticism of age or greater flexibility of youth), the practice is known as age cheating in the field of sports.

In the entertainment industry

Actors and comedians
Gracie Allen, comedian, was notorious for keeping her true age concealed and even her husband George Burns did not know her exact age. Various sources claim she was born on July 26 in 1894, 1895, 1897, 1902 or 1906. Her exact age could not be retrieved by a birth certificate, as it was destroyed in the 1906 San Francisco earthquake. Allen herself gave her year of birth as 1906, despite the fact the earthquake occurred three months before her birthday that year. When the 1900 United States Census became public information, the true year was revealed as 1895, which meant she was actually a few months older than her husband.
Doris Day long claimed to have been born on April 3, 1924, but public records show her year of birth was 1922. Day had attempted to explain the discrepancy, saying that as a young woman she pretended to be two years older so she could sing with big bands. However, US census records show that she was 7 years old on April 1, 1930, and 18 years old on April 10, 1940, indicating that she was born in 1922. One day before her birthday in 2017, she admitted that she was about to turn 95 rather than 93, after the Associated Press obtained a copy of her birth certificate.
Katharine Hepburn used her brother's birthday of November 8 and shaved 2 years off her age.
Al Lewis, actor from The Munsters, is reported by various sources to have been born on April 30 in either 1910 or 1923. Shortly after Lewis' death, his son claimed that he was actually born in 1923. This contradicts Lewis' own statement that he was born in 1910. Lewis claimed to have graduated from high school in 1927 and to have earned a PhD from Columbia University in 1941, but research by Dan Barry of The New York Times failed to reveal evidence of either. In April 2006, Lewis' listing on the Social Security Death Index gave his date of birth as April 30, 1923.
Various dates were given for the birth year of Sondra Locke, with 1947 being her most commonly reported birth year. In 1989, her half-brother told The Tennessean that she was actually born in 1944.
Although Norm MacDonald had listed his birth year as 1963, he was actually born in 1959.
Simon Oakland, a prolific character actor, claimed in media interviews to have been born in 1922, a date repeated in his obituary in The New York Times. Vital records indicate his actual year of birth was 1915.
Comedienne Judy Tenuta often listed her date of birth as November 7, 1956; however, her true birth year was revealed to be 1949 upon her death in 2022.
Fred Willard often listed his date of birth as September 18, 1939. Although speculation has risen since at least 2012 after his arrest about his year of birth being in 1933, it was not confirmed until his daughter announced his death in 2020, with the 1940 Census confirming he was 6 years old when it was taken in April of that year.

Musicians
Laura Branigan's 2004 obituaries reported that she was born in 1957. Media reports in the 1970s indicated her birth year was 1955, and circumstantial evidence suggests her actual year of birth was 1952.
Jazz violinist Joe Venuti was known for providing conflicting information regarding his date of birth, claiming to have been born as early as 1894 and as late as 1906; music writer Gary Giddins said that "depending on which reference book you consult, (Venuti's age when he died in 1978) was eighty-four, eighty-two, eighty, seventy-five, seventy-four, or seventy-two."

Online and social media 
Many websites and online services ban children under 13-years-old from joining their platforms in compliance with the Children's Online Privacy Protection Act, a U.S. federal law which prohibits website operators under U.S. jurisdiction from collecting personal information about children under age 13 without parental consent. To avoid the ban, many children under 13 falsify their age in order to sign-up to use those websites, many with the help of an adult. As of 2012, it was estimated that around 5 million Facebook users are under the age of 13.

In law and politics

Conscription 
There are many stories of men lying about their age to join the armed forces: for example, to fight in World War I. In mid-1918, Walt Disney attempted to join the United States Army to fight against the Germans, but he was rejected for being too young. After forging the date of birth on his birth certificate to 1900, he joined the Red Cross in September 1918 as an ambulance driver. Conversely, those wishing to avoid conscription may also falsify their age: the birthdate of Henryk Gulbinowicz, Bishop Emeritus of Wroclaw, Poland and a cardinal of the Roman Catholic Church, was changed from 1923 to 1928 by his parents and his parish priest to prevent him from being conscripted during World War II.

Immigration 
In 2016 the United Kingdom Home Office reported 2/3 of allegedly child refugees from Calais were adults.

Politics 
Joseph Stalin, born December 18 (December 6 OS), 1878, changed the date to December 21, 1879, later in his life for unknown reasons. The December 18, 1878, birth date is maintained by his birth registry, his school leaving certificate, his extensive tsarist Russia police file, and all other surviving pre-revolution documents. Russian playwright and historian Edward Radzinski argues in his book, Stalin, that Stalin changed the year to 1879 to have a national birthday celebration of his 50th birthday. He could not do it in 1928 because his rule was not absolute enough. The incorrect December 21, 1879, date was printed in many almanacs and encyclopedias during Stalin's reign and remains one of the most widely reported incorrect dates of birth.
Eva Perón, born May 7, 1919, had her birth certificate altered to 1922 after becoming First Lady of Argentina. She made herself seem to be younger and also to appear that her parents had been married when she was born.

Others
While official records of film producer S. S. Vasan show his date of birth as March 10, 1903, according to his family he was actually born on January 4, 1904. Film historian Randor Guy suggested in 2003 that, as with many families in that period, Vasan's date of birth could have been deliberately fabricated to help in his school admission. The 1903 date of birth entered Vasan's SSLC book, and has remained his official date of birth since, although a postage stamp of him was released in 2004 to commemorate his centenary.

Notes

References

State of California. California Birth Index, 1905–1995. Center for Health Statistics, California Department of Health Services, Sacramento, California.
State of Texas. Texas Birth Index (1903–1997). Texas Department of State Health Services.
Dawn of a New Age  Baseball America, July 8, 2002. Chart of nearly 300 players found to have falsely recorded ages.

Forgery
Fraud
 
Cheating in sports